Robert Schumann's Introduction and Concert Allegro in D minor for piano and orchestra, Op. 134, was one of his last works. Composed in 1853, Schumann gave the autograph score to his wife, Clara Schumann, as a birthday gift; she would give the first performance on 26 November. The work is dedicated to Johannes Brahms, and a typical performance is 13–14 minutes long.

Scoring 
The Introduction and Concert Allegro is scored for solo piano, pairs of flutes, oboes, clarinets in B and A, bassoons, horns, and trumpets, trombone, timpani and strings.

References

External links 

1853 compositions
Compositions by Robert Schumann
Compositions for piano and orchestra
Compositions in D minor
Schumann